Nathan Raymond Quinn Haynes (born September 7, 1979) is a retired Major League Baseball outfielder. His major league debut came with the Los Angeles Angels of Anaheim on May 28, and he has played all three spots in the outfield since debuting. His mother is Karen Haynes, father is John Haynes, sister Kayla and two nieces

Biography
Haynes was drafted by the Oakland Athletics while his mother Karen Haynes stuck by his side in the 1st Round (32nd overall) of the  amateur draft. On July 29, he was traded with Jeff DaVanon and Elvin Nina to the Angels for Omar Olivares and Randy Velarde. After the  season, Haynes became a minor league free agent and signed with the San Francisco Giants. Haynes played in only 8 games for the Giants minor league system over the next two years before becoming a free agent and re-signing with the Angels. He became the second former Gary SouthShore RailCats player to later land on a Major Leagues roster when he saw the field with the Los Angeles Angels in 2007. He played in 40 games for the Angels, hitting .267 with 1 RBI and 1 stolen base. His mother is Karen Haynes, father unknown, sister Kayla and two nieces.

On March 28, Haynes was claimed off waivers by the Rays. On May 10, 2008, Haynes was designated for assignment. He retired from baseball after the 2008 season.

External links
MLB.com Player Profile

thebaseballcube.com

1979 births
Living people
Los Angeles Angels players
Tampa Bay Rays players
African-American baseball players
Baseball players from Oakland, California
Major League Baseball outfielders
Arizona League Athletics players
Southern Oregon Timberjacks players
Modesto A's players
Lake Elsinore Storm players
Visalia Oaks players
Erie SeaWolves players
Arkansas Travelers players
Rancho Cucamonga Quakes players
Salt Lake Stingers players
Fresno Grizzlies players
Arizona League Giants players
Gary SouthShore RailCats players
Salt Lake Bees players
Durham Bulls players
21st-century African-American sportspeople
20th-century African-American sportspeople